Constitution of 1931 may refer to:

Spanish Constitution of 1931
1931 Constitution of Ethiopia
1931 Yugoslav Constitution